Jonathan Cissé (born 18 May 1997) is an Ivorian footballer who plays as a defender for Hapoel Hadera.

Career

Cissé started his career with the reserves of Monaco, one of France's most successful clubs but left due to injury.

In 2019, he signed for Hapoel Hadera in Israel after almost joining French Ligue 1 side Lens.

References

External links

 
 

1997 births
Living people
Ivorian footballers
Association football defenders
AS Monaco FC players
Hapoel Hadera F.C. players
Championnat National 2 players
Israeli Premier League players
Expatriate footballers in France
Expatriate footballers in Israel
Ivorian expatriate sportspeople in France
Ivorian expatriate sportspeople in Israel